Eriogonum flavum is a species of wild buckwheat.

Common names 
This flower has several common names, including but not limited to: Pipers buckwheat, Pipers golden buckwheat, Yellow umbrella plant, and Pipers Wild Buckwheat.

The species epithet flavum is Latin for yellow and indicates its flower colour.

Description 
Eriogonum flavum is a perennial herb from taproot and woody caudex that forms dense mats in small areas, with leafless stems approximately 5–20 cm high. The dark green, 2.5–7 cm long leaves are spatulate-oblanceolate with long petioles. The plant is greenish above, while heavily whitish-tomentose below. This perennial herb re-emerges from taproot and woody caudex, and is likely long lived.

Flowers late May to mid July. The inflorescence is a dense umbel (umbrella shaped clusters,) with leaf like bracts at its base. There is one heavily villous involucre, roughly 5–6 mm high per ray of the umbel. The perianth is 4–6 mm long, very hairy, and typically pale yellow. it produces an aroma, that is unpleasant to humans but attracts pollinating bees. Roughly half of the viable population produce flowers in a given season, and seed are uncommon, further supporting longevity. Downhill transport of seeds is primary way of dispersal, but wind probably aids in dispersal uphill. However, downhill growth of caudex branches aids in vegetative dispersal. Fruit are 3–5 mm long  three angled achenes that are sparsely pubescent at tip.

"Inflorescences subcapitate or umbellate, 0.5-3(-5) × 0.3-2.5(-3) dm; branches tomentose to floccose; bracts 4-6, leaflike to semileaflike at proximal node, 0.5-2 × 0.2-0.5 cm, sometimes absent immediately below involucre. Involucres 1 per node, turbinate to campanulate, 3-9 × 2-5 mm, tomentose to floccose; teeth 5-8, erect, 0.2-1 mm. Flowers 3-7 mm, including 0.2-1.5 mm stipelike base; perianth pale to bright yellow, densely pubescent abaxially; tepals monomorphic, oblong; stamens exserted, 3-6 mm; filaments pilose proximally. Achenes light brown to brown, 3-5 mm, glabrous except for sparsely pubescent beak."

Human and wildlife uses 
The plant has been observed as browse for many species of animal, including deer, elk, horses, bighorn sheep and mountain goats which browse the umbels. Blue grouse consume the leaves, as well as insects. Plains tribes of Native Americans used the mashed roots of this plant as ear plugs, and the flowers as an additive for the tanning of buffalo hides. The roots were eaten by children as a sweet snack

Subspecies and varieties 
There are three subspecies of this species, with subspecies piperi containing two varieties:
 Subspecies flavum: A much grayer version of the species, with grayish leaves above and whitish leaves below. Typically found east of the Rocky Mountains.
 Subspecies piperi var. linguifolium:  Leaves greenish above, but involucres are less than 5mm long and with more bell shaped bases. The teeth are also longer, usually more than 0.5mm. Found west of the Rocky Mountains
 Subspecies piperi var. piperi: Also green above, but the involucres are greater than 6mm, and the involucre teeth are generally shorter than 0.5mm. Also found west of the Rocky Mountains.
 Subspecies aquilinum: The most northern representative of the species at large. 5-7mm long involucres, densely tomentose (especially on lower surfaces).

Habitat 
This plant is generally found at moderate to high elevation, and grows on rocky open soils to ridges, or grasslands. Grows at 1,000 m in the Yukon, and as low as 170 m in Alaska, although the average throughout the southern portion of its range is around 2133.6 m.  Associated with rock, scree, gravel, silt and loamy substrates. Usually associated with southern facing 20o to 50o slopes.

Distribution 
This species of plant has a very extensive range, including most of the Pacific Northwest. It is found north to British Columbia, south to the Blue Mountains of Oregon and California, east to south central Idaho, Colorado, and southwestern Alberta. Subspecies aquilinum is found north to the eastern portions of Alaska and throughout British Columbia and the Yukon.

References 

 Alaska Rare Plant Field Guide, University of Alaska Anchorage, Timm Nawrocki, Justin Fulkerson, Matthew Carlson, Alaska Natural Heritage Program. Accessed pdf on 6/4/2015
 Botany.cz, Eriogonum flavum
 Discover Life, Plants Database, United States Dept. of Agriculture
 Alaska's Changing Boreal Forest, Copy write Oxford University Press, 2006. Edited by F. Stuart Chapen III et al.
 Relationships of Site Characteristics to Vegetation in Canyon Grasslands of West Central Idaho and Adjacent Areas, E. W., Tisdale, M., Bramble-Brodahl, Journal of Range Management, Vol. 36, No. 6 (Nov., 1983), pp. 775–778
 Great Sand Dunes National Monument and Preserve, Vascular Plant Inventory, Susan Spackman Panjabi and Karin Decker Colorado Natural Heritage Program, Colorado State University, December 30, 2002
 A WORKSHOP ON THE USES AND IMPORTANCE OF NATIVE PLANTS OF SASKATCHEWAN, Saskatchewan Agriculture and Food Prairie Farm Rehabilitation Administration, Ducks Unlimited Canada, Pasture and Grazing Technology Program, September 21 and 22, 1994
 Wildflowersearch.com

External links

flavum
Flora of North America